This article lists albatrosses that have been scored in important golf tournaments. An albatross, also called a double eagle, is a score of three-under-par on a single hole. This is most commonly achieved with two shots on a par-5, but can be done with a hole-in-one on a par-4.

Major championships
This is a list of albatrosses scored in men's major championships.

World Golf Championships
This is a list of albatrosses scored in World Golf Championships events.

The Players Championship
This is a list of albatrosses scored in The Players Championship.

BMW PGA Championship
This is a list of albatrosses scored in the BMW PGA Championship.

Women's major golf championships
This is a list of albatrosses scored in women's major golf championships.

Sandra Post scored an albatross in the 1978 du Maurier Classic, the year before it became a major. Sophie Gustafson scored an albatross in the 1999 Women's British Open, two years before it became a major.

Par-4 hole-in-one
This is a list of those hitting a hole-in-one on a par-4 in professional tournament play.

References

Albatross
Albatross